John Fergusson may refer to:
John Fergusson (politician), Scottish-Canadian politician
John Duncan Fergusson, Scottish artist and sculptor
Sir John Fergusson, 1st Baronet (died 1729), of the Fergusson baronets

See also
John Ferguson (disambiguation)
Fergusson (disambiguation)